is a railway station in Suzuka, Mie Prefecture, Japan, operated by Ise Railway. The station is 11.1 rail kilometers from the terminus of the line at Kawarada Station.

History
Tokuda Station opened on March 16, 1991.

Lines
Ise Railway
Ise Line

Station layout
Tokuda Station has a two opposed side platforms. The station is unattended.

Platforms

Adjacent stations 

|-
!colspan=5|Ise Railway

External links

 Official home page 

Railway stations in Japan opened in 1991
Railway stations in Mie Prefecture